Cylindrepomus hayashi is a species of beetle in the family Cerambycidae. It was described by Hüdepohl in 1987.

References

Dorcaschematini
Beetles described in 1987